Nudix hydrolase 15 is a protein that in humans is encoded by the NUDT15 gene.

Function 

This gene encodes an enzyme that belongs to the Nudix hydrolase superfamily. Members of this superfamily catalyze the hydrolysis of nucleoside diphosphates, including substrates like 8-oxo-dGTP, which are a result of oxidative damage, and can induce base mispairing during DNA replication, causing transversions. The encoded enzyme is a negative regulator of thiopurine activation and toxicity. Mutations in this gene result in poor metabolism of thiopurines, and are associated with thiopurine-induced early leukopenia. Multiple pseudogenes of this gene have been identified.

NUDT15 germline variants (e.g., a missense SNP:rs116855232, inducing R139C) have been linked to clinical usage of thiopurines (e.g., mercaptopurine) in acute lymphoblastic leukemia as well as inflammatory bowel diseases to avoid thiopurine-induced leukopenia. These variants also exhibit ethnicity-specific (e.g.,variant allele of rs116855232 is high is East Asians and Hispanics but low in Caucasians and Africans). Rare functional variants even singletons in this gene have also been identified to be related to thiopurine-induced myelotoxicity, suggesting the whole gene screening should be taken to determine the initial dosage using of thiopurine.

References

Further reading

External links 
 

Nudix hydrolases